Frontline 1993–1997: Rarities and Remixes is a compilation album by the British electronica band Asian Dub Foundation. It was released in 2001, and contains tracks recorded between 1993 and 1997.

Track listing 
"Witness (DJ Scud remix)"
"Change a Gonna Come"
"Strong Culture (Juttla & Charged mix)"
"Change a Gonna Come (Panicstepper remix)"
"Rivers of Dub"
"Tu Meri (Wayward Soul remix)"
"Nazrul Dub"
"Jericho (Capa D dub)"
"P.K.N.B. (Dry & Heavy Connection dub)"
"C.A.G.E. (via pirate satellite)"
"Operation Eagle Lie"

Asian Dub Foundation albums
2001 compilation albums
2001 remix albums